The Mazowe Dam (or Mazoe Dam) is a dam on the Mazowe River in Zimbabwe, in the Iron Mask Hills about  north of Harare. Constructed in 1920, it was built mainly to provide irrigation for the Mazoe citrus estates. The dam was also home to the Hunyani Rowing Club and formerly provided facilities for St. Georges, Prince Edward, Arundel and other rowing clubs. It is the only major dam on the Mazowe River.

It can hold 35 million cu m of water and has a surface area of 445 ha when full. However, prolonged drought in the first two decades of the 21st century has left the dam virtually empty, badly damaging local agricultural production. It had previously almost dried up in the droughts of 1984-85 and again in 1996, but even after the breaking of the most recent drought the dam has remained empty.

References

Mazowe River
Dams in Zimbabwe
Dams completed in 1920
1920 establishments in the British Empire